Mutant League Records is an American independent record label based in Chicago.  Established in 2012, Mutant League has released albums for seminal pop-punk groups such as Seaway, Belmont, and As It Is among others.  As of 2022, the label has sold over 250,000 albums worldwide.

Owner Nate Steinheimer commented on the label's inception, "I spent my weekends sweating through Descendents T-shirts in crowded Chicago basements [...] I aim to house artists that influence people to become as passionate about music as I was growing up."   In July 2013, Mutant League announced their partnership with Sony RED and fellow Chicago label Victory for worldwide distribution.

The label contributed music for the soundtrack of the 2018 Xbox One/PlayStation 4 title Mutant Football League, which included tracks from Seaway, Belmont, Vacant Home, Ambleside, & Lucky Boys Confusion.

Following the dissolution of Victory Records in 2019, Mutant League moved under the umbrella of Sony Music subsidiary The Orchard for distribution in North America.  The label celebrated their 10-year anniversary with a string of Midwest tour dates in the Summer of 2022, which featured Settle Your Scores, Chief State, and Wilmette.

Bands
This list includes artists who have released albums through Mutant League:
A Better Hand
Allister
AM Taxi
Ambleside
Anna Sage
As It Is
Crywank
A Fight For Life
Belmont
Chief State
Home Grown
Johnny Goth
Lucky Boys Confusion
The Movielife
Night Owls
Picture Perfect
Rest Easy
Reward
Safe To Say
Seaway
Settle Your Scores
Vacant Home
Wilmette
With The Punches

References

External links 
 

American independent record labels
Record Labels
Pop punk
Punk record labels
Alternative rock record labels
Hardcore record labels
Indie rock record labels